Tihāmiyyah (Arabic: تهامية Tihāmiyyah; also known as Tihamiyya, Tihami) is the variety of Arabic originally spoken by the tribes, that belongs to the historic region of Yemeni Tihamah (Yemeni part only), although the term Tihamah refers to the Red Sea coastal plain of Arabia from the Gulf of Aqaba to the Bab el Mandeb Strait, including the Saudi (Hejazi) Coast.

Pronunciation
The Tihami Arabic or Tihamiyya dialect has many aspects which differentiate it from all other dialects in the Arab world. Grammatically all Tihami dialects also share the unusual feature of replacing the definite article (al-) with the prefix (am-). The future tense, much like the dialects surrounding Sanaa, is indicated with the prefix (š-), for all persons, e.g. ša-būk am-sūq "I will go to the Souq". Some Tihami dialects, such as that spoken in Al-Hodeida, are otherwise fairly similar to other Yemeni dialects in grammar and syntax, differing mainly in vocabulary, while others can be so far from any other Arabic dialect that they are practically incomprehensible even to other Yemenis.

See also

Varieties of Arabic
Yemeni Arabic
Zabid

References

External links
 Shaghi, Abdullah and Imtiaz Hasanain (2009). Arabic Pausal Forms and Tihami Yemeni Arabic pausal /u/: History and Structure. In Hasnain S. Imtiaz (ed.) Aligarh Journal of linguistics. Department of Linguistics, Aligarh Muslim University, Aligarh, India. Vol. 1, January- December 2009, 122-139.

Arabic languages